This is an incomplete list of those who were made Knights/Dames Grand Cross of the Order of the Bath from the date of the Order's structural change by the Prince Regent on behalf of his father, King George III, on 2 January 1815. Knights/Dames Grand Cross use the post-nominal GCB. Those Knights living at the time of the reorganisation of the Order automatically became Knights Grand Cross, with the post-nominal GCB.

Knights/Dames Grand Cross

George III

George IV

William IV

Victoria

Edward VII

George V

George VI

Elizabeth II

Charles III

Honorary Knights/Dames Grand Cross

Military division

Civil division

See also
List of Knights and Ladies of the Garter
List of Knights and Ladies of the Thistle
List of Knights and Dames Grand Cross of the Order of St Michael and St George
List of Knights Grand Cross of the Order of the British Empire

References 

Order of the Bath
Bath